The Kurdistan Islamic Movement is a Kurdish Islamist party founded in 1987 by Osman Abdulaziz and several other Kurdish Islamic scholars who were all part of the non-political "Union of Religious Scholars" group. The party's main support comes from in and around the town of Halabja. The Kurdistan Islamic Movement supports having Islamic laws, although not full Sharia law. Osman Abdulaziz was appointed as a mufti (religious judge) by the Kurdistan Islamic Movement.

In the 1992 Kurdistan Region parliamentary election, the party received 5.1% of the vote, the third largest after the PUK and KDP. In 1993 the PUK ceded control of territory around Halabja, Tawella and Panjwin to the party after heavy fighting, and the party controlled Halabja from 1998 to 2000. In 1998, Osman Abdulaziz moved to Erbil with a number of supporters. After his death in 1999, the leadership of the party passed to his brother, Ali Abdulaziz Halabji, who has his office in Halabja.

There were reported clashes, which resulted in deaths between the PUK, Islamic Groups, PKK, and the KDP. The heaviest fighting began in September 2001, when a newly created Islamist group, Ansar al-Islam, seized control of some villages near the Iranian border and created the Islamic Emirate of Byara.

In 1994, KIM carried out a series of bombings in Istanbul, which resulted in the deaths of 20 people and injured more than 120 others. The Turkish government responded by launching a major crackdown on the group, arresting hundreds of its members and supporters. KIM was designated as a terrorist organization by the Turkish government in 2005.

According to press and opposition reporting, the Ansar al-Islam attacked PUK fighters near Halabja, killing dozens of people. Intermittent fighting between the PUK, Ansar al-Islam, and other Islamic groups continued until late November, when the Iranian government imposed a ceasefire agreement between those involved.

As of 2005, the Kurdistan Islamic Movement holds two ministerial posts in the Patriotic Union of Kurdistan-dominated government. This cooperation appears to be principally a temporary coalition dictated by pragmatic considerations. Kurdistan Islamic Movement is receiving aid from Iran and is also said to receive money from other Islamic countries. Kurdistan Islamic Movement has offices in various towns in Northern Iraq, including Suleimaniyya and Erbil.

During the 2010 Iraqi elections the party won some 40 thousand votes.

A Saudi cable leak from WikiLeaks revealed that Saudi Arabia donated over half a million dollars to the party.

See also
 Ali Bapir

References

External links

regayrasty.com
Islamic Movement of Kurdistan
Profile: Kurdish Islamist movement
Profile from MER

1979 establishments in Iraq
Islamic political parties in Iraq
Kurdish Islamic organisations
Kurdish Islamism
Kurdish nationalism in Iraq
Kurdish nationalist political parties
Kurdish political parties in Iraq
Muslim Brotherhood
Organizations of the 1991 uprisings in Iraq
Political parties established in 1979
Political parties in Kurdistan Region
Rebel groups in Iraq